State Road 182 (NM 182) is a , paved, two-lane state highway in Doña Ana County in the U.S. state of New Mexico. NM 182 western terminus is in La Union at the road's end at La Union Townsite, and the eastern terminus is at the road's junction with NM 28 within the La Union community NM 182 is also known as Mercantil Avenue.

Route description
The highway begins at the junction with NM 28 east of community of La Union. The road heads west through pecan orchards and fields of Mesilla Valley for  before turning southwest. The highway continues to follow Mercantil Avenue until it ends at La Union Townsite.

History
The section occupied by modern day NM 182 was initially built in 1950 as a portion of NM 273 connecting La Union with El Paso. In the late 1990s to early 2000s this stretch was removed from NM 273 and was designated as NM 182. After NM 416 was decommissioned in mid-2000s NM 182 was shortened down to its current length and rerouted away from Alvarez Road.

Major intersections

See also

References

External links

182
Transportation in Doña Ana County, New Mexico